Jana Novotná and Barbara Schett were the defending champions but were eliminated in the round robin.

Magdalena Maleeva and Rennae Stubbs defeated Martina Navratilova and Selima Sfar in the final, 3–6, 7–5, [10–8] to win the ladies' invitation doubles tennis title at the 2015 Wimbledon Championships.

Draw

Final

Group A
Standings are determined by: 1. number of wins; 2. number of matches; 3. in two-players-ties, head-to-head records; 4. in three-players-ties, percentage of sets won, or of games won; 5. steering-committee decision.

Group B
Standings are determined by: 1. number of wins; 2. number of matches; 3. in two-players-ties, head-to-head records; 4. in three-players-ties, percentage of sets won, or of games won; 5. steering-committee decision.

References
 Draw

Women's Invitation Doubles